Justine Uche Prince is a professional footballer from Nigeria. He currently plays for Thai League 2 side Samut Sakhon F.C.

He previously played for BBCU F.C. in Thai Division 1.

References

External links
Thai Soccer Net Player Profile
Cambodia Football

Living people
Nigerian footballers
Justine Uche Prince
Justine Uche Prince
Expatriate footballers in Cambodia
1990 births
Phnom Penh Crown FC players
Association football forwards
People from Owerri
Sportspeople from Imo State